The Muncel is a left tributary of the river Crivadia in Romania. It flows into the Crivadia in Baru, close to its confluence with the Strei.

References

Rivers of Romania
Rivers of Hunedoara County